United Air Lines Flight 629, registration N37559 and dubbed Mainliner Denver, was a Douglas DC-6B aircraft that was blown up on November 1, 1955, by a dynamite bomb placed in the checked luggage. The explosion occurred over Longmont, Colorado, United States, at 7:03 p.m. local time, while the airplane was en route from Denver to Portland, Oregon, and Seattle, Washington. All 39 passengers and 5 crew members on board were killed in the explosion and crash.

Investigators determined that John Gilbert Graham was responsible for bombing the airplane in a bid to kill his mother as revenge for his childhood and to obtain a large life insurance payout. Within fifteen months of the explosion, Graham—who already had an extensive criminal record—was tried, convicted, and executed for the crime.

Flight and explosion
United Airlines Flight 629 had originated at New York City's La Guardia Airport on November 1, 1955, and made a scheduled stop in Chicago before continuing to Denver's Stapleton Airfield, landing eleven minutes late at 6:11 p.m. Captain Lee Hall (41), a World War II veteran, assumed command of the flight for the segments to Portland and Seattle.

Flight 629 took off at 6:52 p.m. and at 6:56 p.m. made its last transmission, stating it was passing the Denver omni. Seven minutes later, Stapleton air traffic controllers saw two bright lights suddenly appear in the sky north-northwest of the airport. Both lights were observed for 30–45 seconds, and both fell to the ground at roughly the same speed. Upon observing the mysterious lights, the controllers quickly determined there were no aircraft in distress and contacted all aircraft flying in the area; all flights were quickly accounted for except for Flight 629.

Numerous telephone calls soon began coming in from farmers and other residents near Longmont, who reported loud explosions and fiery debris falling from the night sky—the remains of Flight 629. Ground searchers who reached the crash site determined that all 44 people aboard the DC-6B had been killed. The debris from the accident was scattered across  of Weld County.

The large load of fuel ignited on impact, according to fire patterns. The fires were so intense that despite efforts to extinguish them they continued to burn for three days.

There was early speculation that something other than a mechanical problem or pilot error was responsible for the crash, given the magnitude of the in-air explosion. The November 2 edition of The New York Times reported a witness to the tragedy describing what he heard:
"Conrad Hopp, a farmer who lives near the crash scene, said he and members of his family 'heard a big explosion—it sounded like a big bomb went off and I ran out and I saw a big fire right over the cattle corral. I hollered back to my wife that she'd better call the fire department and ambulance because a plane was going to crash.  Then I turned around and it blew up in the air.

Victims 
All 44 people aboard the aircraft were killed. The ages of the victims ranged from 13 months to 81 years.

Investigation
The investigation by the Civil Aeronautics Board (CAB) determined that the aircraft began to disintegrate near the empennage, or tail, and that the aft fuselage had been shattered by a force strong enough to cause extreme fragmentation of that part of the aircraft. The explosion had been so intense that investigators thought it unlikely to have been caused by any aircraft system or component. There was also a strong smell of explosives on items from the number 4 baggage compartment (which was at the back).

Suspicions that a bomb had been placed in luggage loaded aboard the aircraft were fueled by the discovery of four pieces of an unusual grade of sheet metal, each covered in a gray soot. Further testing of the cargo pit showed that each piece was contaminated with chemicals known to be byproducts of a dynamite explosion, the origin of which was believed to be a passenger's luggage. The Federal Bureau of Investigation (FBI), certain that the aircraft had been brought down by a bomb, performed background checks on the passengers.

In the earlier stages of the investigation, investigators discovered that United Airlines management was locked in a dispute with a local airline union at the time of the crash, leading to the theory that the bombing of Flight 629 was an attempt to damage the airline's reputation; this theory was later excluded from the investigation.

Investigators then focused their efforts on Denver locals, citing that they may have had personal enemies. A few passengers had purchased life insurance at the airport just before boarding. One such insuree, as well as local, was Daisie Eldora King, 53, a Denver businesswoman who was en route to Alaska to visit her daughter. When agents identified King's handbag, they found a number of newspaper clippings containing information about her son, John Gilbert Graham, who had been arrested on a forgery charge in Denver in 1951. Graham, who held a grudge against his mother for placing him in an orphanage as a child, was the beneficiary of both her life insurance policies and her will. Agents also discovered that one of King's restaurants, the Crown-A Drive-In in Denver, had been badly damaged in an explosion; Graham had insured the restaurant and then collected on the property insurance following the blast.

Agents subsequently searched Graham's house and automobile. In the garage they found wire and other bomb making parts that were identical to those found in the wreckage. They also found an additional $37,500 ($ today) in life insurance policies; however, King had not signed either these policies or those purchased at the airport, rendering them worthless. Graham told FBI agents that his mother had packed her own suitcase. However his wife, Gloria, revealed that Graham had wrapped a "present" for his mother on the morning of King's flight.

Faced with the mounting evidence and discrepancies in his story, on November 13, 1955, Graham finally confessed to having placed the bomb in his mother's suitcase, telling the police:

Trial
Authorities were shocked to discover that there was no federal statute on the books at the time (1955) that made it a crime to blow up aircraft. Therefore, on the day after Graham's confession, the district attorney moved swiftly to prosecute him via the simplest possible route: premeditated murder committed against a single victim—his mother, Daisie Eldora King. Thus, despite the number of victims killed on Flight 629 along with King, Graham was charged with only one count of first degree murder. It was the first trial in Colorado to be televised, and it was covered by Denver stations KLZ (now KMGH) and KBTV (now KUSA).

A motion by the defense attempted to have Graham's confession thrown out on the grounds that he had not been made aware of his rights prior to signing it, but the motion was denied. At his 1956 trial, Graham's defense was unable to counter the massive physical evidence and witnesses presented by the prosecution. He was convicted of the murder of his mother and, after a few short delays, was executed in the Colorado State Penitentiary gas chamber on January 11, 1957.

Aftermath
As a result of the aircraft explosion, and because there was no law against bombing an aircraft, a bill was introduced and signed by President Dwight D. Eisenhower on July 14, 1956, which made the intentional bombing of a commercial airline illegal.

United Airlines still uses the flight number 629 today on its Washington (National) – Chicago (O'Hare) route.

The bombing of United Flight 629 is depicted in the opening segment of the 1959 film The FBI Story, starring James Stewart and Vera Miles. Actor Nick Adams portrays Jack Graham. The bombing is also the subject of "Time Bomb", the fourth episode of season one of Investigation Discovery's series A Crime to Remember, which first aired December 3, 2013.

Similar incidents
Flight 629 was the second known case of an airliner being destroyed by a bomb over the mainland United States. The first proven case of sabotage by bomb in the history of commercial aviation occurred on October 10, 1933, near Chesterton, Indiana, when the empennage was blasted from a United Air Lines Boeing 247 by a nitroglycerin bomb triggered by a timing device. The three crew members and four passengers were killed in the crash. No suspect was ever brought to trial in the case.

Graham was reportedly inspired to commit the crime by hearing of a similar incident, the Albert Guay affair in Quebec, in 1949.

Other crashes in the United States caused by bombs include: 
National Airlines Flight 967 near Gulf Coast of Louisiana on November 16, 1959, killing 42
National Airlines Flight 2511 over North Carolina on January 6, 1960, killing 34.
Continental Airlines Flight 11 over Unionville, Missouri on May 22, 1962, killing 45.

See also

Aviation safety

References

Further reading

External links
 

20th-century mass murder in the United States
1955 in Colorado
1955 murders in the United States
Explosions in 1955
Accidents and incidents involving the Douglas DC-6
Airliner accidents and incidents in Colorado
Airliner bombings in the United States
Longmont, Colorado
Mass murder in 1955
629
Weld County, Colorado
Matricides
November 1955 events in the United States
Aviation accidents and incidents in the United States in 1955
Airliner bombings